Grant Howell (born 10 February 1984) is a South African cricketer. He played in ten first-class and fifteen List A matches for Eastern Province between 2004 and 2008.

See also
 List of Eastern Province representative cricketers

References

External links
 

1984 births
Living people
South African cricketers
Eastern Province cricketers
Cricketers from Port Elizabeth